Christina "Chrissy" Cadorin (born October 19, 1980) is a Canadian curler from Thornhill, Ontario. She currently plays third on Team Cathy Auld.

Career
Cadorin was born in North York, Ontario. As a junior curler, Cadorin won two Junior Mixed junior mixed titles, in 1999 playing lead on a team skipped by John Morris and in 2001 playing third on a team skipped by Sean St. Amand.

In university, Cadorin was a member of the Laurier Golden Hawks curling team.

In 2006, Cadorin joined Team Jenn Hanna, playing third on the team. The team played in one Grand Slam event that season, Cardorin's first, the 2006 Trail Appliances Autumn Gold Curling Classic. The team missed the playoffs. Cadorin remained on the team for one more season before forming her own rink in 2008 with Colleen Madonia, Janet Murphy and Kate Hamer.

In the 2008-09 season, Cadorin's new team entered four Grand Slam events, the 2008 Trail Appliances Curling Classic, the 2008 Casinos of Winnipeg Classic, the Wayden Transportation Ladies Classic and the 2008 Sobeys Slam. The team missed the playoffs in all four events. They began the season with Madonia skipping the team, while Cadorin threw last stones, however Cadorin would eventually take over skipping duties.

For the 2009-10 season, Cadorin joined the Jo-Ann Rizzo team, playing third for the rink. Cadorin played in the 2009 Manitoba Lotteries Women's Curling Classic with the team, missing the playoffs. 
Ṣ
In 2010, Cadorin left the Rizzo rink to form her own team once again, and has been a skip ever since.

In December 2017, Cadorin won the Ontario Trophy Championship, in the first year it was a direct qualifier for the Ontario Scotties Tournament of Hearts.

Personal life
Cadorin posed partially-nude as a model in the 2009 Women of Curling calendar. She works as a regional sales manager.

References

External links
Team Cadorin Website 

1980 births
Living people
Canadian women curlers
People from Thornhill, Ontario
Sportspeople from North York
Curlers from Toronto
21st-century Canadian women